This page lists the official World Champions – Professional Ballroom of the World Dance Council (WDC), and its historical predecessors. The championships are authorized and organized under the auspices of the WDC. The designation Ballroom replaces the previously used Modern or Standard in WDC terminology; it does not include the latin dances.

World Championships of a sort have been held in ballroom dancing since 1909 when Camille de Rhynal held annual championships in Paris. Records of the years prior to the First World War are sketchy, and it is only since 1922 when the sport split into professional and amateur levels that complete records have been kept. The 1922 championships were also the first to award a single 'world championship' as opposed to titles in the individual dances. The World Championships were held in France from 1925 to 1939, in Paris except for one year in Nice.

These annual competitions only became official in 1936, and since 1937 the title was held by dancers from the United Kingdom for the rest of that century. With the outbreak of the Second World War, the championships were put on hold for six years. Following its revival, the professional ballroom dancing world was becoming more and more fragmented as competing organizations vied for domination. Finally, in September 1950 the ICBD (International Council of Ballroom Dancing) was founded, becoming the world's first international professional dance organisation, and all other competitions claiming to be the 'World Championships' were boycotted by member nations.

The Championships returned once again in 1959 under the control of the ICBD, though that year was something of a trial run. The first officially awarded championship of the new series came in 1960, and have continued since then. The ICBD was renamed as the World Dance & DanceSport Council (WD&DSC), and renamed again as the WDC.

The Professional Ballroom section (occasionally called Professional Modern in British tradition) of DanceSport) covers the dances waltz, foxtrot, quickstep, tango and Viennese waltz.

World Champions

See also 
 World Latin Dance Champions
 World 10 Dance Champions
 Professional Showdance World Champions
 Dancesport World Champions (smooth)
 Dancesport World Champions (rhythm)
 U.S. National Dancesport Champions (Professional Standard)
 U.S. National Dancesport Champions (Professional 10-Dance)

References 

Ballroom dance competitions
Ballroom dance
Ballroom